The FIS Cross-Country Nor-Am Cup is a series of cross-country skiing events arranged by the International Ski Federation (FIS). It is one of the nine FIS Cross-Country Continental Cups, a second-level competition ranked below the Cross-Country World Cup. The Nor-Am Cup is open for competitors from all nations, but are mainly a competition for skiers from Canada. 

The Nor-Am Cup has been held since the 2001 season, and has been a part of the Cross-Country Continental Cup since the 2004–05 season.

World Cup qualification
In the end of certain periods, the overall leaders for both genders receive a place in the World Cup in the following period. The overall winners of the season receive a place in the World Cup in the beginning of the following season.

Overall winners

Men

Women

References

External links
2019–20 Season Calendar at the International Ski Federation (FIS)

NorAm Cup
Recurring sporting events established in 2001